Money Madness is a 1948 film noir mystery film directed by Sam Newfield starring Hugh Beaumont and Frances Rafferty.

Plot
Steve Clark (Hugh Beaumont) is on a Los Angeles-bound bus and gets off in a small town en route. In his suitcase he has been carrying loot from a bank robbery; he stashes it in a safety deposit box. He becomes a taxi driver, which leads him to a chance encounter with Julie Saunders (Frances Rafferty), a local woman in her 20s. Julie lives with an elderly, bitter aunt who makes her life miserable. Clark, with his charm and original outlook on life, instantly becomes a ray of sunlight for her, and they quickly marry.

However, Clark soon admits to her that the marriage is part of a plan he has crafted, to help him launder his ill-gotten cash—but it also involves murder and will make Julie an accessory to it, against her will.

Cast
 Hugh Beaumont as Steve Clark
 Frances Rafferty as Julie
 Harlan Warde as Donald
 Cecil Weston as Cora
 Ida Moore as Mrs. Ferguson
 Danny Morton as Rogers
 Joel Friedkin as Mr. Wagner
 Lane Chandler as Policeman

Reception

Critical response
Film critic Dennis Schwartz, while giving the film a mixed review, liked the feature, writing, "A low-grade film noir that has its chilling moments. It opens with Julie Saunders (Frances Rafferty) sentenced to a prison term of ten years for being an accomplice to murder. A flashback is used to show how a sweet girl like Julie could have gotten into such deep trouble ... Beaumont went on to be Ward Cleaver in television's Leave It to Beaver, but here he's great to watch as a sleazeball and sicko killer. It's film where it takes a suspension of belief to get through all the problems built into the implausible plot, but nevertheless the film has a certain insanity kicking in that somehow works to give it an edge."

Production 
Ben Winkler served as the sound engineer for the film.

References

External links
 
 
 
 
 
  (public domain)

1948 films
American mystery films
American black-and-white films
1940s English-language films
Film noir
Films directed by Sam Newfield
Film Classics films
1948 mystery films
1940s American films